Blue Metropolis (also known as Blue Met) is an international literary festival held annually in Montreal since 1999. Founded by Montreal writer Linda Leith, it is one of the world's first multilingual literary festival. In early 2011, Leith departed, and a new president and a new director of programming were hired. 

The festival is put on by Blue Metropolis Foundation, a not-for-profit organization established in 1997. The foundation offers educational and social programs year-round, in classrooms and online.

History
Blue Metropolis was inspired by an earlier event. In 1996, three Montreal writers who were members of the Writer's Union of Canada (Linda Leith, Ann Charney, and Mary Soderstrom) organized a new literary event in partnership with the Union des écrivaines et des écrivains québécois (UNEQ). Called 'Write pour écrire'.

In 1997, Leith went on to establish Blue Metropolis Foundation as uniquely 'created by writers and readers for writers and readers'. 

The first Blue Metropolis Montreal International Literary Festival took place April 19 to 23, 1997. Its programming, which took place in French or English or both, included the first Blue Metropolis Translation Slam and literacy/community writing activities, as well as readings, on-stage interviews, and panel discussions. 

After the event, the foundation was able to expand its scope beyond the festival and organize educational programs for young people, from the primary school to cégep levels.

The name 'Blue Metropolis' was partially inspired by the philosophical essay 'On Being Blue', in which the American writer William H. Gass investigates the many different and contradictory connotations of the word 'blue'.

In 2017, the festival added an LGBTQ-themed stream called Violet Metropolis, in conjunction with the city's existing Violet Hour reading series. In 2018, the festival created the Blue Metropolis Violet Prize to honor Canadian LGBTQ writers.

Awards
The festival presents a number of annual awards.

Blue Metropolis International Literary Grand Prize
 Marie-Claire Blais (2000)
 Norman Mailer (2001)
 Mavis Gallant (2002)
 Maryse Condé (2003)
 Paul Auster (2004)
 Carlos Fuentes (2005)
 Michel Tremblay (2006)
 Margaret Atwood (2007)
 Daniel Pennac (2008)
 A. S. Byatt (2009)
 Dany Laferrière (2010)
 Amitav Ghosh (2011)
 Joyce Carol Oates (2012)
 Colm Tóibín (2013)
 Richard Ford (2014)
 Nancy Huston (2015)
 Anne Carson (2016)
 Anita Desai (2017)
 Charles Taylor (2018)
 Annie Proulx (2019)

Premio Metropolis Azul
In 2013, the festival announced a new prize, the Premio Metropolis Azul. Given each year to an author from any country or region for a work of fiction written in Spanish, English, or French, the prize is awarded to works which explore some aspect of Hispanophone culture or history. The prize is sponsored by Ginny Stikeman.

 Sergio Ramírez, La fugitiva (2013)
 Luis Alberto Urrea, Queen of America (2014)
 Junot Díaz (2015)
 Valeria Luiselli (2016)
 Francisco Goldman (2017)
 Leila Guerriero (2018)

Blue Metropolis First Peoples Prize

The Blue Metropolis First Peoples Prize is awarded to a North American Indigenous writer for a work in any genre. Winners have included:

 Annharte (2015)
 Thomas King (2016)
 David Treuer (2017)
 Lee Maracle (2018)

Blue Metropolis Words to Change Prize
The Blue Metropolis Words to Change Prize is awarded to a writer whose work connects communities, whether they be linguistic, religious, ethnic or other communities:

 Gene Luen Yang (2015)
 Abdourahman Waberi (2016)
 Imbolo Mbue (2017)
 Charif Majdalani (2018)

Literary Diversity Prize
In 2016 the festival announced a new prize in association with the Conseil des arts de Montréal. The work is awarded to a first or second generation migrant to Quebec, residing in Montreal, from a multi-cultural community, written in French or English, for a first publication in Quebec.

 Ghayas Hachem, Play Boys (2016)
 Xue Yiwei, Shenzheners (2017)
 Alina A Dumitrescu, Le cimetière des abeilles (2018)

Blue Metropolis Violet Prize
The Blue Metropolis Violet Prize, created in 2018, honors an established LGBTQ writer for their body of work.

 Nicole Brossard (2018)
 Dionne Brand (2019)

Blue Metropolis Al Majidi Ibn Dhaher Arab Literary Prize
The festival in the past also awarded the Blue Metropolis Al Majidi Ibn Dhaher Arab Literary Prize. Named after the 17th-century poet al-Majidi ibn Dhaher, the prize was initiated in 2007 and is worth CAD $5,000. The prize is sponsored by the Abu Dhabi Authority for Culture and Heritage. Dr Issa J Boullata served as consultant for the prize and the jury is composed of an international roster of poets, novelists, and literary professionals. The prize is currently on hiatus.

Past winners of the Al Majidi Ibn Dhaher Prize are:
 Elias Khoury (2007)
 Saadi Youssef (2008)
 Zakaria Tamer (2009)
 Joumana Haddad (2010)
 Alaa Al Aswany (2011)
 Ahdaf Soueif (2012)
 Hisham Matar (2013)
 Habib Selmi (2014)

References

External links
 Official homepage
Literary festivals in Quebec
Festivals in Montreal